The red three-striped opossum (Monodelphis umbristriata) is an opossum species from South America. It is found in Brazil.

References

Opossums
Marsupials of South America
Mammals of Brazil
Endemic fauna of Brazil
Mammals described in 1936
Taxobox binomials not recognized by IUCN